Yea is a former railway station on the Mansfield railway line in Yea, Victoria, Australia. The tracks have been removed and the railway reserve has been turned into the Yea Railway Park.

The park includes the historic railway station and about five hectares of parkland. It has a picnic shelter, barbecue, toilets, playground, skatepark, walking track and community reserve, and includes a Rotary park. The station building houses Blackthorn Textiles (a privately-run craft shop). Also on the site is the former goods shed, which is available for hire. The Yea Country Market is held in the park on the first Saturday of each month, and local artists hold an exhibition and sale in the goods sheds each Easter.

Prior to its closure, the station platform was shortened in length from 91.5m to 85.5m in 1976.

The site is listed on the Victorian Heritage Register.

References

External links
 Victorian Railway Stations - Yea

Railway stations in Australia opened in 1883
Railway stations closed in 1978
Disused railway stations in Victoria (Australia)
Mansfield railway line
Listed railway stations in Australia
Victorian Heritage Register Hume (region)
Shire of Murrindindi